Sankt Ulrich bei Steyr is a municipality in the district of Steyr-Land in the Austrian state of Upper Austria.

Geography
Sankt Ulrich lies in the Traunviertel. About 51 percent of the municipality is forest, and 40 percent is farmland.

Notable locations 
Landgasthof Mayr - continuously run inn founded in 1313, family business today managed by Mr. Christian Mayr

References

Cities and towns in Steyr-Land District